William Grefé (born 1930) is an American writer and director of films, best known for his work in the exploitation field. For most of his career he has worked in Florida. He also worked for a number of years with Ivan Tors.

In 2009 a documentary was released about his work called From the Swamp: The Films of William Grefe.

In 2020 a four-disc Blu-ray collection He Came from the Swamp: The William Grefé Collection will be released by Arrow Video.

Select credits

The Checkered Flag (1963)
I Eat Your Skin (1964) - second unit
Racing Fever (1964)
Sting of Death (1965)
Death Curse of Tartu (1966)
 The Devil's Sisters (1966)
Wild Rebels (1967)
The Hooked Generation (1968)
The Naked Zoo (1970)
Stanley (1972)
Alligator Alley (1972)
The Godmothers (1973)
Impulse (1974)
Mako: The Jaws of Death (1976)
Whiskey Mountain (1977)
The Psychedelic Priest (2001)
Marooned (2013)

References

External links

Official website

American film directors
1930 births
Living people